Lon Leonard Chapman (October 1, 1920 – October 12, 2007) was an American  actor best known for his numerous guest star appearances on television drama series.

Early years
Chapman was the son of Elmer and Eunice Chapman, He was born on October 1, 1920, in Tulsa, Oklahoma, but lived thereafter in Joplin, Missouri. He graduated from Joplin High School and, in 1940, from Joplin Junior College. He enlisted in the United States Marine Corps and served in the South Pacific during World War II. In 1947, Chapman graduated with a BFA degree from the University of Oklahoma at Norman.  Then in 1947 he hitchhiked with Dennis Weaver, his best friend at the university, to New York City, where he landed the role of Turk in Come Back, Little Sheba.

 Television 
Chapman's first role on television was in 1951 on the series Starlight Theatre, playing the part of an arrogant high-school football player in an episode titled "Miss Bruell". Throughout the remainder of the 1950s, he continued to be cast in other series and gain experience in supporting roles. In 1958 he portrayed detective Jeff Prior in the NBC series The Investigator. He appeared twice on the CBS series The Defenders from 1961 to 1965.  Seven years later, he played another detective, Frank Malloy, in the CBS series For the People.

Some of the other series in which Chapman appeared in supporting roles or as a guest star include Gunsmoke, Harbourmaster, The Rifleman, The Lloyd Bridges Show, The Everglades, Decoy, Dundee and the Culhane, Mission: Impossible, Storefront Lawyers, Quincy, M.E., The A-Team, The Virginian, Matlock, NYPD Blue, Bonanza and Murder, She Wrote. In 1964 he also performed on Perry Mason, portraying a murderer, Jack Talley, in "The Case of the Tandem Target". He appeared as well in the 1966 episode "Lone Woman" of The Road West.  Between 1972 and 1975, he guest-starred too in three episodes of NBC's McCloud, which starred his friend Dennis Weaver, whom Chapman had originally urged to go into show business.  In the late 1970s, he appeared in the episode "The Waterhole" on The Oregon Trail (1977), the episode "Now You see Her..." on The Eddie Capra Mysteries (1978), and as the character L. Patrick Gray in the miniseries Blind Ambition (1979).

 Film 
Chapman first film role was "Ernie the plumber" in the 1955 movie Young at Heart. During his lengthy career, his appearances include roles in East of Eden (1955), Baby Doll (1956), The Birds (1963), The Cowboys (1972), Where the Red Fern Grows (1974), Norma Rae (1979), 52 Pick-Up (1986) and Reindeer Games (2000).

Stage
Chapman debuted as a professional actor on stage in Chicago, where he portrayed Wiley as in a company presenting Mr. Roberts. His first Broadway appearance was as a guard in The Closing Door (1949). He also portrayed Tom in a revival of The Time of Your Life on Broadway and at the Brussels World's Fair.

From 1956 to 1961, he taught acting in New York. In 1973, he became artistic director of the non-profit Group Repertory Theatre in North Hollywood, California. In 1999, its name was changed to the Lonny Chapman Group Repertory Theatre. During his tenure, the group presented more than 350 productions.

Plays that he wrote included The Buffalo Skinner (1958), Cry of the Raindrop (1960), Hoot Sudie (1970), Go Hang the Moon (1974), Night at the Red Dog (1979), and Happy Days Are Here Again Blues'' (1979).

During the summers of 1959 through 1967, Chapman directed and produced more than 80 plays in Fishkill, New York, and he acted in more than 30 of them.

Recognition
In the fall of 2005, Chapman was named "Outstanding Alumnus" at Missouri Southern State University, in his hometown of Joplin. Chapman's best friend since his university days, fellow actor Dennis Weaver, had previously received that honor.

Personal life and death
In 1944, Chapman married the former Erma Dean Gibbons of Joplin, Missouri.  The couple remained married for 63 years and had two children:  a daughter, Linda Dean, and a son, Wyley. On October 12, 2007, at the age of 87, Chapman died of complications from heart disease at a care facility in North Hollywood.

Filmography

References

External links
TV Tome site on Lonny Chapman

Theater Mania Obituary
LA Times Obituary

1920 births
2007 deaths
People from Joplin, Missouri
Male actors from Missouri
United States Marine Corps personnel of World War II
American male film actors
American male television actors
20th-century American dramatists and playwrights
Missouri Southern State University alumni
University of Oklahoma alumni
United States Marines
20th-century American male actors